The Twilight (in Persian: Gagooman) is a 2002 Iranian film.

Cast
Fatemeh Bijan
Zalkla Bijan
Ali Reza Mahdaviyan
Ali Reza Shalikaran

References

External links

 

2002 films
Iranian drama films
2000s Persian-language films
2002 drama films